Merauder is an American metalcore band from New York City, formed in 1990.

History 
The group formed in 1990, establishing itself on the New York hardcore and metal scene through frequent touring and a few demo releases. In 1995, the band released an EP after vocalist Jorge joined, replacing Minus, and toured with Biohazard. Upon the release of their 1996 debut, the band scored a slot opening for Fear Factory and toured Europe in 1995 with Böhse Onkelz.
Merauder shifted into crossover thrash and metalcore genres. The band split up following the recording of their 2003 release Bluetality.

In 2007, vocalist Jorge Rosado formed his own version of the band. Guitarist Anthony Muccini publicly opposed Rosado's use of the name Merauder, though Muccini himself is not an original member, having replaced the original guitarist, "Karate" Chris Bozeth.

In 2008, the band announced completion of a new studio album recorded at Big Blue Meenie studios in Jersey City, New Jersey, and embarked on headline tours through Europe, Japan, and the U.S. The band also finished touring with the Haunted and the Agonist. A new album titled God Is I was released June 19, 2009, in Europe and August 11, 2009, through Regain Records. Although there were many difficulties with the European release, Regain has sent the copies only to Germany, Switzerland, Austria and the Netherlands.

In December 2009, Merauder toured around Europe with Entombed and Devious. Their last show was at Eindhoven's Metal Meeting, where they shared the stage with Satyricon, Nile and Legion of the Damned.

In May the band went on a tour around the US West Coast (including a festival in Las Vegas with Donnybrook and Grave Maker) and Mexico. In August they joined This is Hardcore festival in Philadelphia, along with Bane, Cro-Mags, Sheer Terror, Death Before Dishonor and more.

In February 2011, a fan-made video for the song "Until" surfaced online featuring Rosado and Smerdon.

In Summer of 2018 Merauder returned to Europe for a full tour with UK metal/hardcore band Climate Of Fear, featuring Rosado and long-time bassist Kevin Mahon and members of Climate Of Fear filling in.

Discography 
Demo Tape with Minus on vocals (1993)
Split EP with Stigmata (1995, Stone Records)
Master Killer (1996, Century Media)
Demo Tape with Eddie Sutton of Leeway on vocals (1998)
Five Deadly Venoms (1999, Century Media)
Bluetality (2003, Century Media)
Master Killers: A Complete Anthology (Compilation) (2007, Century Media)
God is I (2009, Regain Records)

Covers 
 'Downfall of Christ' by Heaven Shall Burn (Album – Iconoclast (Part 1: The Final Resistance))
 'Life is Pain' by Hatebreed (Album – For the Lions)
 'Master Killer' by God Forbid (Century Media Records's 2CD compilation Covering 20 Years of Extremes)
 'See You in Hell' from Grim Reaper's album See You in Hell (1984) (Featured on the album God is I)
 'Master Killer' by Twitching Tongues,a bonus track on the album World War Live

Band members

Current members 
Jorge Rosado – vocals (1995–2003, 2008–present)
 Kevin Mahon – guitar (2018–present), bass (2013–2018) 
 Dylan Tobia – bass (2018–2019)
Rob "Big Rob" Castoria – guitar (2018–2020)
Jay Shine – drums (2018–present)
J.T Anderson - bass (2019 - present)

Former members 
Vocalists
Minus Rodriguez (of Minus1)
Eddie Sutton (of Leeway)

Guitarists
Javier Carpio (died 2006)
"Karate" Chris Bozeth
Anthony Muccini
Delvin "DJ" Hodges
Dave Stafford
Darian Polach
Ernesto Colon (2013–2018)
Andrew "Lumpy" Francis

Bassists
Eamon Carney
Rick Lopez
Michael MacIvor (of Candiria, Dead Air, Rampage)
Javier E. Javier
Drew Smerdon
Owen Derrill

Drummers
Vinny Vitale
Pokey Mo (of Leeway)
Dave Chavarri
Walter "Monsta" Ryan (of D.R.I., Machine Head, Madball)
Bobby Blood (2008–2018)
Mike Palmeri (of Life of Agony, Wrench)
George Bignell

Original lineup – 1990 demo 
Minus – vocals
Javier Carpio "Sob"- guitar
"Karate" Chris Bozeth – guitar
Eamon Carney – bass 
Vinny Vitale – drums

References

External links 
 Official Merauder page on Myspace (archived)
 Merauder on last.fm
 Merauder on Regain Records

Musical groups established in 1990
Hardcore punk groups from New York (state)
Heavy metal musical groups from New York (state)
Musical groups from Brooklyn
American thrash metal musical groups
Demons Run Amok Entertainment artists
Metalcore musical groups from New York (state)